1038 Tuckia, provisional designation , is rare-type Hilda asteroid from the outermost regions of the asteroid belt, approximately 58 kilometers in diameter. It was discovered on 24 November 1924, by German astronomer by Max Wolf at Heidelberg Observatory in southwest Germany. The asteroid was named after American banker and philanthropist Edward Tuck and his wife.

Classification and orbit 

Tuckia is a member of the Hilda family, an orbital group of asteroids in the outermost main-belt, that stay in a 3:2 orbital resonance with the gas giant Jupiter. This means that the asteroid makes 3 orbits for every 2 orbits Jupiter makes.

It orbits the Sun at a distance of 3.1–4.9 AU once every 7 years and 11 months (2,902 days). Its orbit has an eccentricity of 0.22 and an inclination of 9° with respect to the ecliptic. The asteroids's observation arc begins with its official discovery observation at Heidelberg.

Physical characteristics 

In the Tholen classification, Tuckia is a rare DTU:-type, a subtype of the dark D-type asteroids.

Lightcurves 

In the 1990s, a rotational lightcurve of Tuckia was obtained from photometric observations by Swedish astronomer Dahlgren and colleges during a survey of Hildian asteroids. Lightcurve analysis gave a somewhat longer than average rotation period of 23.2 hours with a brightness amplitude of 0.1 magnitude.

Diameter and albedo 

According to the survey carried out by the Japanese Akari satellite, Tuckia measures 52.69 kilometers in diameter and its surface has an albedo of 0.030, while the Collaborative Asteroid Lightcurve Link derives an albedo of 0.0304 and a diameter of 58.36 kilometers based on an absolute magnitude of 10.82.

Naming 

This minor planet was named after American banker and philanthropist Edward Tuck (1842–1938) and his wife. He is the son of Amos Tuck who was a founder of the Republican Party in the United States. The name was suggested by G. Camille Flammarion. The official naming citation was published by Paul Herget in The Names of the Minor Planets in 1955.

References

External links 
 Asteroid Lightcurve Database (LCDB), query form (info )
 Dictionary of Minor Planet Names, Google books
 Asteroids and comets rotation curves, CdR – Observatoire de Genève, Raoul Behrend
 Discovery Circumstances: Numbered Minor Planets (1)-(5000) – Minor Planet Center
 
 

001038
Discoveries by Max Wolf
Named minor planets
001038
19241124